, known by her maiden name , is a Japanese former singer, actress, and idol whose career lasted from 1972 to 1980. Often simply referred to by her given name "Momoe," Yamaguchi is one of the most successful singers in Japanese music, releasing 32 singles, including three number one hits, and 21 studio albums. She also starred in 15 feature films and several television serial dramas. At age 21, Yamaguchi retired at the height of her popularity to marry her frequent costar, Tomokazu Miura; she has never performed or made a public appearance since. Therefore, she is called a legendary idol in Japan.

Biography

Early life and career
Momoe Yamaguchi was born on 17 January 1959 at Tokyo Metropolitan Hiroo Hospital in Ebisu, Shibuya, Tokyo.

Not long afterwards she was left in the care of her maternal grandparents. At around four, she returned to her parents and the family then moved to Yokohama. Her father, a medical doctor who was married to another woman with children, was never married her mother. The family moved once again to Yokosuka. Her mother raised Momoe and her younger sister Toshie by herself. Toshie Yamaguchi studied in the US from partway through high school to college while Momoe made a life in Japan. Momoe has a niece in the US who she has never met. 

Yamaguchi began a career in show business while she was still a student in junior high school. At the end of 1972, at the age of 13, Yamaguchi, along with many of her schoolmates, applied by postcard to appear on the idol talent search television show Star Tanjō!. After a series of successful preliminary auditions, she appeared on the show covering a hit song "Kaiten Mokuba", by Yumi Makiba earlier that year. Though she finished second, Yamaguchi received offers from several music producers, and signed with Hori Productions. Her family moved to Tokyo. Yamaguchi transferred to Shinagawa Joshi Gakuin, and then attended Hinode Joshi Gakuin High School, a school which allows its students to carry on careers in show business.

Initially she was promoted together with two other singers, Junko Sakurada and Masako Mori, as the Hana no Chūsan Torio (meaning "The lovely trio of third-year middle school students") since they were all in the third year of middle school (chūsan).

Her first single, "Toshigoro", coupled with her first movie of the same title, did not fare well in the charts, peaking at 37 on the Oricon singles chart. But her second single "Aoi Kajitsu" peaked at number 9. Japanese pop culture historians have credited its success to its suggestive lyrics. The chorus goes "You can do what ever you want with me; it's OK if rumors spread that I'm a bad girl".

Her early songs were written for her by the Hori Productions songwriting team of composer Shunichi Tokura and lyricist Kazuya Senge. One of her biggest hits was her 5th single "Hito natsu no Keiken" ("an experience one summer"), which includes lyrics like "I'll give you the most precious thing a girl has". and "Everyone experiences it at least once, the sweet trap of seduction". The suggestive lyrics attracted widespread press interest. The young singer was frequently asked salacious questions such as "What do you think a girl's most precious thing is?", to which she replied magokoro ("her devotion").

Rising popularity
By the end of 1974, her phenomenal popularity was demonstrated by her being invited to be the opening female singer for the 25th Kōhaku Uta Gassen, Japan's most popular musical show, with the song Hito Natsu No Keiken. She would continue to appear in this show every year until her retirement.

With her increasing popularity, Yamaguchi gained more control over her career and was able to select her own songwriters. One of her choices was Ryudo Uzaki. She chose him because she liked his song "Secret Love", recorded by the Down Town Boogie Woogie Band. Their first collaboration resulted in the single "Yokosuka Story" in 1976, written by Uzaki with lyrics by his wife, Yoko Aki. Aki was inspired to write the song because both she and Yamaguchi, whom she had never met when the song was originally ordered, had both lived in Yokosuka. "Yokosuka Story" was Yamaguchi's biggest hit, selling more than 600,000 copies, and peaked at number one on the charts. This was the beginning of a collaboration with the husband and wife songwriting team which only ended with Yamaguchi's retirement. Songs were also written for her by writers such as Masashi Sada, who wrote one of her most popular hits, "Cosmos". 

Her popularity as a singer was paralleled by rising success in a series of films and television programs. Her second film, Izu no Odoriko, paired her with actor Tomokazu Miura, chosen because he had previously done a commercial for Glico with her. Although Yamaguchi was 15 while Miura was 22, they had great screen chemistry, and became known as the Momoe-Tomokazu "golden combi". They starred together in a total of 14 of her 17 movies, one every winter and summer.

As she became popular, her father, Kubo, decided to cash in on her success. He held bogus "press conferences" unauthorized by either Yamaguchi or her management company, and in various ways disrupted her career. Since Yamaguchi was still a minor, he sued for the right of parental authority. The court case ended in a victory for her mother. Yamaguchi declared in her autobiographical book that she ended her relationship with her father, and would never acknowledge his existence again. She also expressed the regret that if she had not become famous, this would not have happened.

By the end of her career, Yamaguchi's music became more sophisticated. Her 12th and 18th albums, Golden Flight and L.A. Blue, were recorded in London and Los Angeles respectively, using local musicians and production staff. Her 21st album, Phoenix Densetsu, was written as a rock opera. Because she wanted to make a rock song before she ended her career, Uzaki and Aki wrote "Rock 'n Roll Widow" for her, which was included on the concept album Moebius's Game. 

When her television series were broadcast in China in the 1980s, she also became hugely popular as an actress there. In China she is known as 山口百惠 (the final character is slightly different from that used in Japan), pronounced "Shan Kou Bai Hui". According to a 2000 poll by the "News Station" news magazine programme, she was the Japanese person known most widely among the Chinese.

Marriage and retirement
With the on-screen romances between Yamaguchi and Tomokazu Miura, an off-screen romance grew. During a trip to Hawaii in early 1979, Miura proposed to Yamaguchi. She accepted, and she also said that she would retire from entertainment to marry him. Yamaguchi announced their relationship at a concert in October 1979, and the announcement about their marriage date and her retirement was made in March 1980. Billboard magazine stated in 1980 that the farewell concert by Momoe Yamaguchi was expected to gross $22.2 million. She performed the farewell concert at the Nippon Budokan on 5 October 1980, released her last album This is my trial on 21 October 1980, and released her last single "Ichie" on 19 November 1980. By the time of her retirement, Yamaguchi was responsible for over 25% of the sales at Horipro. She also wrote the lyrics to this song under the pen name "Kei Yokosuka", and continued to write a few songs for a while after retirement, such as Ann Lewis's La Saison from 1982.

In her autobiographical book, Aoi Toki, she said that she disliked repeatedly singing the same songs. She also stated that she wanted to stop working to devote all her time to the wellbeing of her husband. She also said in an interview at the time of retirement that she did not want to continue working as a singer or an actress. 

On 15 October 1980, Yamaguchi officially retired from show business, and on 19 November 1980, the pair were married. Despite several rumors of her comeback, she has devoted herself to being a homemaker and mother to two sons. Her husband, Tomokazu Miura, continued to work as an actor, even though his career up to then had mostly consisted of playing romantic leads in her films and television series.

After retirement

In 1981, she wrote a book of autobiographical essays called Aoi Toki, which sold over a million copies in its first month of publication.

Despite her retirement, she is a regular feature in weekly entertainment magazines. Her family suffered considerable difficulty in attending school events due to television crews and photographers, who sometimes used deception to gain access. Fans have frequently been found hanging around her residence, and in at least one case a fan even broke in. In 1999, her husband, Tomokazu Miura, wrote a part-autobiography Hishatai detailing the problems the couple had faced.

Her two sons, Yūtarō and Takahiro Miura, both also entered careers in entertainment. Yūtarō entered the music business under the pseudonym "Yū" in a now-defunct group called "Peaky Salt". Initially it was not known that he was Momoe and Tomokazu's son. Takahiro is an actor who has appeared in several films and television programs.  Takahiro is also a qualified lifeguard because he was a swimmer and surf lifesaver from high school and university. 

Yamaguchi's hobby is quilt making, and she exhibits her quilts under her married name, "Momoe Miura".  
In 2011, she was selected in a poll as "The ideal mother".

New musical products continue to go on sale, such as a boxed DVD set of her appearances on television program Yoru No Hitto Sutajio ("Evening Hit Studio") in 2010. In a November 2011 television interview, Ryudo Uzaki said that she still receives a healthy income from record royalties. Her television dramas continue to be available on DVD, and from 2010 have been repeated daily on the TBS Channel cable television station.

In 2011, Tomokazu Miura wrote a book entitled Aishō (compatibility) explaining the secret of their happy marriage. In 2012, the couple came first for the seventh consecutive year in a poll by the Meiji Yasuda life insurance company to find "the ideal celebrity couple" as considered by married people in their 20s to 50s.

Discography

Studio albums 
The following list gives the studio albums released during her career.

Toshigoro (としごろ; 1973)
Aoi Kajitsu/Kinjirareta Asobi (青い果実／禁じられた遊び; 1973)
Momoe no Kisetsu (百恵の季節; 1974)
Hito Natsu no Keiken (ひと夏の経験; 1974)
15-sai (15才; 1974)
16-sai no Theme (16才のテーマ; 1975)
Sasayaka na Yokubō	(ささやかな欲望; 1975)
17-sai no Theme (17才のテーマ; 1976)
Yokosuka Story (横須賀ストーリー; 1976)
Pearl Color ni Yurete (パールカラーにゆれて; 1976)
Momoe Hakusho (百恵白書; 1977)

Golden Flight (1977)
Hana Zakari (花ざかり; 1977)
Cosmos (Uchū) (Cosmos (宇宙); 1978)
Dramatic (1978)
Manjushaka	(曼珠沙華マンジューシャカ; 1978)
A Face in a Vision (1979)
L.A. Blue (1979)
Harutsugedori (春告鳥; 1980)
Möbius's Game (1980)
Phoenix Densetsu (不死鳥フェニックス伝説; 1980)
This is My Trial (1980)

Live albums
Momoe Live: Momoe-chan Matsuri Yori (百恵ライブ -百恵ちゃん祭りより-; 1975)
Momoe on Stage (1976)
Momoe in Koma (1977)
Momoe-chan Matsuri '78 (百恵ちゃんまつり'78; 1978)
Recital: Ai ga Uta ni Kawaru Toki (リサイタル -愛が詩にかわる時-; 1979)
Densetsu Kara Shinwa e: Budokan... At Last (伝説から神話へ -Budokan... At Last-; 1980)

Singles

Covers
Her songs are regularly covered by other performers. Ayako Fuji released an "enka" version of her hit Manjushaka in 2003. Cosmos has been covered by many artists, including its creator, Masashi Sada, as well as Akina Nakamori. Imitation Gold was covered by Tak Matsumoto with Mai Kuraki in 2003. In 2004, a tribute album Yamaguchi Momoe Toribyuto Thank You For ... appeared of Yamaguchi covers by singers such as Masaharu Fukuyama, Sowelu, and Hiromi Iwasaki. A second volume, Yamaguchi Momoe Toribyuto Thank You For ... Part 2, with more covers, came out in 2005.

In 1991 The Nolans released an album of songs entitled Playback Part 2, containing well-known Yamaguchi songs with English lyrics. (The lyrics are largely newly written rather than translations of the originals, although some of the English parts of the originals are preserved.) The group re-recorded the songs in the album The Nolans Sing Momoe 2005 to commemorate the 25th anniversary of Yamaguchi's retirement. These albums were released only in Japan.

Rina Rahman covered her song "Akai Unmei" in Malay language, entitled "Ku Ingin Bahagia".

JR West Shinkansen services use two chime version of Iihi Tabidachi as part of their next station alerts. The former Twilight Express used a longer balad version of the song.

Filmography

Films 

Apart from her first film Toshigoro and two concert films, all of Yamaguchi's films, from Izu no odoriko on, were romantic stories costarring Tomokazu Miura. Many of them were directed by Katsumi Nishikawa and were remakes of the director's own films. Except for White Love (set in Spain) and Furimukeba Ai (set in San Francisco), almost all of the romantic films with Miura were based on Japanese literary works.

 Toshigoro (directed by  Ichimura)
 Izu no Odoriko (from the short story "The Dancing Girl of Izu" by Yasunari Kawabata) (directed by Katsumi Nishikawa)
 Shiosai (directed by Katsumi Nishikawa)
 Onēchan Ote Yawaraka ni (as herself, her only non-starring role)
 Zesshō (1975) (directed by Katsumi Nishikawa)
 Eden no Umi (directed by Katsumi Nishikawa)
 Kaze tachinu (directed by Mitsuo Wakasugi)
 Shunkinshō (directed by Katsumi Nishikawa)
 Doro darake no Junjō (directed by Sokichi Tomimoto)
 Kiri no Hata, (directed by Katsumi Nishikawa)
 Furimukeba Ai, (directed by Nobuhiko Obayashi), also titled Take me away!
 Honō no Mai (directed by Yoshisuke Kawasaki)
 White Love (directed by Tsugunobu Kotani)
 Tenshi o Yuwaku (directed by Toshiya Fujita)
 Koto (1980) (directed by Kon Ichikawa)

Concert films
 Hana no Kō Ni Torio Hatsukoi Jidai
 Masako, Junko, Momoe - Namida no Sotsugyōshiki Shuppatsu

Television 

On television, most of Yamaguchi's appearances were in a series of dramas with Ken Utsui. Each of these dramas went on for about twenty-six episodes, or half a year. Starting with Kao de waratte and going on to the so-called Akai Series, in each serial drama she and Utsui played a different father and daughter. Echoing Yamaguchi's real-life family issues, all of the Akai series consisted of complex, melodramatic family circumstances such as hidden adoption (Akai Meiro, Akai Giwaku, Akai Kizuna), mistaken identity (Akai Unmei), murder (Akai Meiro, Akai Unmei) or illness (leukemia via radiation poisoning in Akai Giwaku, paralysis via an accidental shooting in Akai Shogeki). 

Some of the serial dramas in the Akai series did not feature Yamaguchi, such as Akai Gekiryu starring Yutaka Mizutani, in which she made a guest appearance in the first episode. Each of the Akai series which she appeared in, except Akai Meiro, featured a title song sung by Yamaguchi herself.

The final Akai program, Akai Shisen, was a two-part story starring her and Tomokazu Miura based on Deadline at Dawn, a novel by William Irish whose Japanese title is Akatsuki no shisen. For the first time Ken Utsui appeared in it not as the father of Yamaguchi's character, but instead in a small part as a carjacking victim and pilot. It also featured cameos from Rentarō Mikuni and Gin Maeda who had starred in Akai Unmei.

 Kao de Waratte
 Ginga Terebi Shōsetsu Akari no Urumu Koro – Three episodes of a long-running NHK series
 Akai Meiro
 Akai Giwaku Theme song Arigato, Anata
 Akai Unmei Theme song Akai Unmei
 Nogiku No Haka (1977) based on a story of Itō Sachio
 Akai Shōgeki Theme songs Akai Shogeki and Hashire, Kaze To Tomo Ni
 Akai Kizuna Theme song Akai Kizuna (Reddo Senseshon) (red sensation)
 Hito wa Sore wo Sukyandaru to Iu
 Yamaguchi Momoe Intai Kinen Supesharu Dorama "Akai Shisen"

See also 

 Notes on lyrics of "Hito Natsu no Keiken" from Japanese Wikipedia.
 Akai series, from Japanese Wikipedia.
 List of best-selling music artists in Japan

Notes

References

External links 
 
 
 

1959 births
Living people
Actresses from Tokyo
Musicians from Shibuya
Japanese women pop singers
Japanese idols
20th-century Japanese actresses